Henry XV, duke of Bavaria, as duke of Lower Bavaria also called Henry III, (28 August 1312 – 18 June 1333 in Natternberg near Deggendorf).

Biography 
Henry was a son of Otto III, Duke of Bavaria and Agnes Glowgow (born 1293-96 – died 25 December 1361). He was called the Natternberger for his favourite residence Natternberg castle. He was born in the year of his father's death and first under tutelage of Louis IV, Holy Roman Emperor. Henry XV ruled then parts of Lower Bavaria with Deggendorf as capital after a conflict with his cousins and co-regents Henry XIV and Otto IV. His candidacy for the Hungarian crown in 1327 was not successful.

Marriage 
Between 1326 and 1328, Henry XV married Anna of Austria. She was a daughter of Frederick I of Austria and Isabella of Aragon. They had no children. She survived him by ten years and went on to marry John Henry IV of Gorizia.

External links 
 
 A listing of descendants of Otto I, Count of Scheyern, including Henry XIII and his children

1312 births
1333 deaths
14th-century dukes of Bavaria
House of Wittelsbach
Medieval child monarchs
Pretenders to the Hungarian throne
Sons of kings